Platyptilia archimedon is a species of moth from the family Pterophoridae. It is known from New Guinea.

References

External links
Papua Insects

archimedon
Moths described in 1938